FC Portovyk Illichivsk was a Ukrainian football club from Chornomorsk (previously known as Illichivsk).

League and cup history

{|class="wikitable"
|-bgcolor="#efefef"
! Season
! Div.
! Pos.
! Pl.
! W
! D
! L
! GS
! GA
! P
!Domestic Cup
!colspan=2|Europe
!Notes
|}

References

 
Portovyk Illichivsk
Football clubs in Chornomorsk
Association football clubs established in 1962
Association football clubs disestablished in 2002
1962 establishments in Ukraine
2002 disestablishments in Ukraine